Campbell County Airport may refer to:

Campbell County Airport (Tennessee) in Jacksboro, Tennessee, United States (FAA: JAU)
Brookneal/Campbell County Airport in Brookneal, Virginia, United States (FAA: 0V4)
Gillette–Campbell County Airport in Gillette, Wyoming, United States (FAA: GCC)